Ronnie Kerr (born Ronald George Smith III, 30 March 1974) is an American actor, best known for playing the role of Romeo in The Army Show and the movie Shut Up and Kiss Me in 2010. He has also starred in many other films and been a personal trainer to several celebrity clients. His first TV role was in NYPD Blue in 2001.

Early and personal life
He was born as Ronald George Smith III in Pompton Plains, New Jersey. He went to Southwestern Oklahoma State University with a full tennis scholarship but then injured his ankle. While rehabilitating, he started using the gym more frequently and carried on with fitness training.

He was then publicly outed in July 2007 when he was spotted in a Chicago gay bar with newly out basketball player John Amaechi.

Career
He moved to Los Angeles in 1996, to act in his first action film Absolute Aggression (also starring Robert Davi), which led to other film roles.

In 2006, he appeared on the cover of the book The Superhero's Closet by H. Andrew Lynch.

He was still acting, and appeared in the third and final series of The Ultimate Coyote Ugly Search,
when he started working on a web series called Flab2Fab! in which he trained gym clients.
 
In 2008, he wrote a fitness column for the Canadian magazine abOUT before it ceased operations in 2011.

In 2011, he moved to San Diego, as many of his friends had already moved there
and formed his own production company, Kerrdog Productions.

In 2015, he wrote a film titled Please Don't Eat the Pansies. In 2016, an Indiegogo campaign was launched to help raise $35,000 to fund the movie. The cast included Mary Wilson of The Supremes, singer/actor Tom Goss and Andrew Lauer.

He was voted one of the top three trainers in Denver, Colorado by Mile High Sports Magazine and one of the top two trainers in Dallas, Texas by the Dallas Voice.

Filmography

Films

Television series

As a producer

Other work
Kerr also had a bit part in the music video for George Strait's song "Don't Make Me Come Over There and Love You", filmed in 2000.

References

External links
 

1974 births
Living people
Film producers from New Jersey
American male film actors
American male television actors
American gay actors
American gay writers
LGBT producers
LGBT people from New Jersey
Male actors from New Jersey
People from Pequannock Township, New Jersey